Scott is an unincorporated community and census-designated place (CDP) in Lonoke and Pulaski counties in the central part of the U.S. state of Arkansas. Per the 2020 census, the population was 97. It is part of the Little Rock–North Little Rock–Conway Metropolitan Statistical Area.

Geography
It is bordered to the west by the city of North Little Rock. Arkansas Highway 161 runs concurrently with the Lonoke-Pulaski county line in the community, progressing northward to U.S. Route 70 and southeast to England, by way of farming areas in southeast Pulaski County.

The CDP's portion in Pulaski County is bisected by Horseshoe Lake, an oxbow lake that was once a channel of the Arkansas River.

Demographics

2020 census

Note: the US Census treats Hispanic/Latino as an ethnic category. This table excludes Latinos from the racial categories and assigns them to a separate category. Hispanics/Latinos can be of any race.

2000 Census
As of the census of 2000, there were 94 people, 40 households, and 29 families residing in the CDP. The population density was 15.7 people per square mile (6.1/km). There were 46 housing units at an average density of 7.7/sq mi (3.0/km). The racial makeup of the CDP was 64.89% White, 34.04% Black or African American, and 1.06% from two or more races.

There were 40 households, out of which 30.0% had children under the age of 18 living with them, 50.0% were married couples living together, 20.0% had a female householder with no husband present, and 27.5% were non-families. 20.0% of all households were made up of individuals, and none had someone living alone who was 65 years of age or older. The average household size was 2.35 and the average family size was 2.76.

In the CDP, the population was spread out, with 25.5% under the age of 18, 6.4% from 18 to 24, 26.6% from 25 to 44, 37.2% from 45 to 64, and 4.3% who were 65 years of age or older. The median age was 43 years. For every 100 females, there were 84.3 males. For every 100 females age 18 and over, there were 89.2 males.

The median income for a household in the CDP was $24,821, and the median income for a family was $32,321. Males had a median income of $16,786 versus $19,464 for females. The per capita income for the CDP was $10,912. None of the population and none of the families were below the poverty line.

Education
Scott CDP is served by the Pulaski County Special School District; however, it does not maintain a school in the area. Previously, the district operated an elementary and a high school in Scott. Since its PCSSD closure, the former Scott Elementary School has reopened as a charter school operated by Maumelle-based Academics Plus Charter Schools, with the campus serving students in kindergarten through sixth grade.

The zoned schools are Harris Elementary School, Mills Middle School, and Wilbur D. Mills High School.

Points of interest

The Arkansas Department of Parks Heritage & Tourism operates two facilities in the Scott area, one on the Pulaski County side and the other on the Lonoke County side, each with a focus on local history:
 Plantation Agriculture Museum, located on the Pulaski County side, displays artifacts from Arkansas's agricultural history in large farming operations, particularly cotton cultivation. The museum is housed in a circa-1912 general store building, and also features a restored 1912 cotton gin, Seed Warehouse #5, and chronicles the period from Arkansas's statehood in 1836 to the end of World War II.
 Toltec Mounds Archeological State Park, located on the Lonoke County side, focuses on the site of a Native American civilization that lived just east of present-day Scott nearly 1,000 years ago. Mounds at the park comprise one of the most significant remnants of Native American life in the state, and are listed on the National Register of Historic Places. The Arkansas Archeological Survey, part of the University of Arkansas system, maintains its Toltec Research Station and laboratory in the park's visitor center.

Additionally, the history of Scott can be found at three other sites around the community. Immediately northeast of Scott Charter School on the Pulaski County side is the Scott Plantation Settlement, a grouping of relocated buildings including the wooden Cotton Belt Railroad Depot that served Scott, collected to represent the area's plantation-era heritage (much in the same fashion as Little Rock's Historic Arkansas Museum). 

Marlsgate Dortch Plantation, the area's best known example of a plantation family home, was constructed on the Lonoke County side by the Dortch family early in the 20th century and is a popular site for weddings and receptions today. 
The All Souls Church (Scott, Arkansas) Interdenominational Chapel is an architectural gem from the turn of the twentieth century. Situated along the county line, the church building is listed on the National Register of Historic Places, and has been in continuous use by the congregation since 1906.
The Fred and Lucy Alexander Schaer House, Ashley-Alexander House, and Longbridge Plantation, Harper-Alexander House are all historic homes located in the area with connections to historic local families.

Prior to a fire that destroyed the structure in 2017, Cotham's Mercantile Store, a widely known community restaurant favored by former President Bill Clinton, was housed in a former general store building constructed in 1912, and displayed multiple antique farm implements.

Notable people
 Catherine Tharp Altvater lived in Scott for the last ten years of her life.

References

External links
Plantation Agriculture Museum
Scenic highlights in Scott as provided by the Arkansas Department of Parks & Tourism

Census-designated places in Arkansas
Census-designated places in Pulaski County, Arkansas
Census-designated places in Lonoke County, Arkansas
Census-designated places in Little Rock–North Little Rock–Conway metropolitan area